The 1977 Omloop Het Volk was the 32nd edition of the Omloop Het Volk cycle race and was held on 5 March 1977. The race started and finished in Ghent. The race was won by Freddy Maertens.

General classification

References

1977
Omloop Het Nieuwsblad
Omloop Het Nieuwsblad